Lolazor (formerly: Qizily) is a village in north-western Tajikistan. It is located in Devashtich District, Sughd Region.

References

Populated places in Sughd Region